Unhinged is a 2020 American action thriller film directed by Derrick Borte, from a screenplay by Carl Ellsworth. The film stars Russell Crowe, Caren Pistorius, Gabriel Bateman, Jimmi Simpson and Austin P. McKenzie. It tells the story of a young woman who is terrorized by a seemingly mentally ill stranger following a road rage incident.

Unhinged was theatrically released by Solstice Studios in Germany on July 16, 2020, and in the United States on August 21, 2020. The film was notable for being the first wide theatrical release in several months due to the COVID-19 pandemic, and grossed $44 million worldwide. It received mixed reviews from critics, who praised Crowe's performance but felt the film did not take full advantage of its premise.

Plot
On a rainy night, a man named Tom Cooper sits in his pickup truck outside of his ex-wife's house. He removes his wedding ring, then grabs an axe and a tank of gas. He proceeds to break into the house, kill his ex-wife and her boyfriend, and sets the house on fire before driving off.

The following morning, Rachel Flynn is awaken by a call from her lawyer and best friend, Andy, about her impending divorce. Later as she drives her son Kyle to school in rush hour traffic, she is fired by one of her clients over the phone. Frustrated with how her life is going, she angrily honks at a pickup truck blocking traffic at a green light. At the next red light, the pickup truck pulls up to Rachel, revealing it to be Tom behind the wheel. Tom apologizes for not going at the previous light and asks Rachel for an apology in return. Rachel refuses, telling him that she has nothing to apologize for. Enraged, Tom vows to teach her what a bad day really is. Down the road, Tom drives speeds in front of Rachel, slams on his brakes, and nearly causes an accident before driving off. Though shaken, Rachel drops Kyle off at school and makes plans to meet Andy at a diner. 

Rachel later stops a gas station. While inside the store, she sees Tom's truck parked outside. A fellow customer escorts Rachel back to her car and relays Tom's license plate number to her, but is then killed after Tom rams him with his truck and propels him into oncoming traffic. Tom then chases Rachel, during which he reveals that he has her phone. Using the info on her phone, Tom goes to the diner and meets with Andy, pretending to be a friend of Rachel's. Using Andy's phone, Tom calls Rachel on a burner phone stashed in her car. When Andy asks for his phone back, Tom smashes a mug across his face and stabs him to death in front of everyone. Tom then tells Rachel that she must choose somone in her contacts to die next. When he suggests her ex-husband, her mother, or Kyle, she chooses the client who fired her. Rachel then calls the police, who respond to the client's home while Rachel races to her son's school.

Tom arrives at Rachel's home, where her brother Fred and his fiancée Mary are living. Tom sneaks inside and Fred arms himself with a knife. Tom confronts him, holding Mary hostage, and explains to him that over time, he began to feel insignificant, powerless and invisible to humanity, and that revenge and violence are all he has left to get him through the day. Tom repeatedly pushes Mary into Fred's knife, accusing Fred of killing her (as he was the one holding the knife). He then ties Fred to a chair and tells Rachel over the phone that she has three minutes to go into the school, get Kyle, and drive away, or he will light Fred on fire, and demands him to read a letter about how Rachel is a liar and how she is selfish. At the school, Rachel desperately demands that the principal release Kyle. She drives away with Kyle. A police officer arrives at Rachel’s house, and, after being told to let Fred go, Tom sets him on fire and pushes him to the cop. The cop is able to shoot a running Tom in the shoulder and tries to put the fire out. Tom catches up to Rachel and Kyle on a highway. They use a GPS app on her tablet to find out that Tom is in a minivan and is right in front of them. When they attempt to alert a nearby police officer, Tom sees them and rams the officer's car, causing a massive multi-vehicle car accident.

Tom pursues Rachel to her mother's house where Kyle triggers a silent alarm to bring the cops and hides. Rachel rams the van that Tom is driving, flipping the vehicle, but he gets out and attacks Rachel, telling her that she will always see Tom everywhere she goes, then enters the house in search of Kyle, intent on killing him. As he is about to walk back outside, Kyle inadvertently alerts Tom to his hiding place upstairs. Rachel sneaks inside the house and finds Kyle, but Tom finds them both and they engage in a brutal fight, beating and throwing each other around the room. When Tom begins to strangle Kyle with a cord, Rachel stabs Tom in the eye with a pair of scissors, screaming, "here's your fucking courtesy tap!", before pushing the scissors further in his eye socket, finally killing him.

The police arrive and inform Rachel that Fred survived Tom's attack. Rachel and Kyle leave to see Fred at the hospital. As they drive away, a car cuts Rachel off and she stops herself from honking at the angry driver. Kyle says, "good choice." They drive away as the sun sets.

Cast

Production
Principal photography took place in the summer of 2019 in Kenner and New Orleans, Louisiana. Production was completed in September 2019.

Release
Unhinged was originally scheduled to be released on August 28, 2020, before being pushed back to September 4. In May 2020, its release was moved up to July 1, 2020, in order to "likely be the first to test the waters as theaters try to rebound" from the COVID-19 pandemic. The date was later pushed back to July 10, then July 31, and, on July 23, the film was again delayed, this time to August 21, 2020.

The film began a premium video on demand release on October 20, 61 days after opening in theaters. Normally if distributors put a film on VOD before the 75-day window, theaters will stop showing it; however, given the pandemic, exhibitors feel it "remains a welcome addition to a limited release schedule".

The film began an international release on July 16 in Germany, and then on July 31 in the United Kingdom, Europe, Australia, Asia, and Latin America. The film was released in Ecuador on August 6, and by VVS Films in Canada on August 14, 2020.

Home media
Unhinged was released on 4K Blu-ray in Germany on November 27, 2020 and on Blu-ray and DVD in the United Kingdom on November 23, 2020.

Reception

Box office 
Unhinged grossed $20.8 million in the United States and Canada, and $23.5 million in other territories, for a worldwide total of $44.3 million.

In its opening weekend in Canada, the film made $601,032 from 299 theaters. Playing in both the United States and Canada the following weekend, the film grossed $1.4 million from 1,823 theaters on its first day, and went on to debut to $4 million over the weekend; 71% of the audience was over the age of 25, with 56% being male. It was the first film with a weekend gross of over $1 million since Onward in March, and despite theater chains reopening some locations the top-five grossing venues were all drive-ins. Deadline Hollywood noted the increase of ticket sales from
Friday to Saturday was likely an indication of audience interest moving forward, while The Hollywood Reporter called the film's debut a win, and said studio executives were "pleased by the results." Playing in 2,331 theaters the following weekend, the film made $2.8 million (a drop of 35%), finishing second behind newcomer The New Mutants. In its third, fourth, fifth weekends of release in the U.S. the film made $1.7 million, $1.5 million, and $1.3 million, respectively, with drive-in theaters remaining its top venues.

Unhinged grossed $251,849 from 380 theaters in its German debut, slightly below expectations but finishing in first place. In its second weekend the film made $201,655 from 438 theaters for a 12-day total in the country of $530,572. In the film's United Kingdom debut, it grossed $230,000 (£174,901) from 250 theaters, becoming the first film to make over £100,000 in the country since the re-opening. By its third week of release, beginning August 7, Unhinged was the top film in six of about 50 countries, and had a running international gross of $5.41 million. Its top markets at the time were Australia ($1.24 million total gross), Germany ($877,000), the Netherlands ($597,000), the United Kingdom ($575,000), New Zealand ($193,000), and Russia ($124,000). It continued to hold the top spot in the UK and Australia the following weekend, with a global running total of $7.7 million.

Critical response 
The website's critics consensus reads, "Russell Crowe makes for a compulsively watchable villain, but Unhinged lacks enough intelligence or depth to get sufficient mileage out of its pulpy premise." On Metacritic, the film has a weighted average score of 40 out of 100, based on 36 critics, indicating "mixed or average reviews".

Guy Lodge of Variety said the film "delivers exactly the nasty B-movie thrills you expect," and wrote, "The carnage is the point here, not any of the reasoning behind it, and Borte and Crowe bring it to a suitably frothing, furious head." Writing for CTV News, Richard Crouse gave the film two stars and specified, "Unhinged distinguishes itself by keeping the pedal to the metal without providing anything new in the way of thrills. As a study of an emasculated man seeking revenge it brings to mind Falling Down, Michael Douglas' 1993 black comedy, except Unhinged is all darkness and no comedy."

Writing for IndieWire, Kaleem Aftab gave the film a "D" and said, "For a film so reliant on the telephone, it's probably not a surprise that Crowe dials in his performance. Dressed heavy-set, Crowe is all grimaces and frowns in disgust at everything around him. His only emotional note is all ANGRY, resulting in a parody of his own performances. It's Crowe on overdrive, and it's horrible."

See also
 Road rage
 Duel (1971 film)
 The Hitcher
 Joy Ride
 Changing Lanes

References

External links
 
 

2020 films
2020 action thriller films
2020s chase films
American action thriller films
2020s English-language films
Films about terrorism in the United States
American chase films
Films set in New Orleans
Films set in Louisiana
Films shot in New Orleans
Films shot in Louisiana
Films scored by David Buckley
Films postponed due to the COVID-19 pandemic
American films about revenge
Films about mother–son relationships
2020s American films